Joust is an action game developed by Williams Electronics and released in arcades in 1982. While not the first two-player cooperative video game, Jousts success and polished implementation popularized the concept. Player 1 rides an ostrich, player 2 a stork. Repeatedly pressing the flap button gains altitude, while a two-directional joystick controls direction. In a collision with enemy knights riding buzzards—or the other player—the higher rider  dismounts the other.

John Newcomer led the development team: Bill Pfutzenreuter, Janice Woldenberg-Miller ( Hendricks), Python Anghelo, Tim Murphy, and John Kotlarik. Newcomer aimed to create a flying game, with cooperative two-player gameplay, while avoiding the overdone space theme.

The game was well-received by players and critics, and the mechanics influenced other games. Joust was ported to numerous home systems and was followed by a more complex and less popular arcade sequel in 1986: Joust 2: Survival of the Fittest.

Gameplay

The player controls a yellow knight riding a flying ostrich. The player navigates the protagonist around the game world, which consists of rock platforms floating above a flat island surrounded by lava, via two-way joystick and a button. The joystick controls the horizontal direction that the knight travels, while the button flaps the ostrich's wings. The rate at which the player repeatedly flaps causes the ostrich to fly upward, hover, or slowly descend. Moving off the left or right edges of the screen wraps around to the other side.

The objective is to defeat the groups of enemy knights riding buzzards in each wave. Upon completing a wave, a more challenging one begins. Players pilot the knight to collide with enemies. The higher of two jousting lances is the winner. A collision of equal height repels the characters apart. A defeated enemy turns into a falling egg which can be collected for points. If the player does not collect the egg, it  hatches into a knight that gains a new mount and must be defeated again (unless the egg falls into the lava, in which case it is destroyed).

There are three types of enemy knight–Bounder, Hunter, and Shadow Lord—which are separate colors and worth different amounts of points. A pterodactyl appears after a predetermined time frame to hunt the hero. The disembodied hand of an indestructible Lava Troll grabs any character flying too low and pulls them into the lava.

In a two-player game, the second player controls a blue knight on a stork. The two players cooperatively complete the waves, optionally attacking each other.

Development
Joust was developed by Williams Electronics, with John Newcomer as the lead designer. The development also included programmer Bill Pfutzenreuter, artists Janice Woldenberg-Miller and Python Anghelo, and audio designers Tim Murphy and John Kotlarik. The game features amplified monaural sound and raster graphics on a 19-inch color CRT monitor. Like other Williams arcade games, Joust was programmed in assembly language. A pack of three AA batteries provide power to save the game's settings and high scores when the machine is unplugged from an electrical outlet. Anghelo stenciled the cabinet artwork on a wooden frame, and designed artwork for promotional materials. One such flyer features archaic English, which was also incorporated into the game's onscreen instructions and game-over message.

Conception
Following the success of the 1981 game Defender, Williams searched for new creative staff. John Newcomer, believing video games to be the future of entertainment, left his job as a toy designer to work at Williams, who hired him to create game ideas as support for development staff. After a few days, he generated a list of ideas that included ideas for his top two games, The War of the Worlds and Joust. Technical specifications dictated the selection because his vision of The War of the Worlds was technologically infeasible, whereas Joust could be accomplished with hardware already available at Williams. A development team was formed, which decided to create the game using Defenders hardware. Newcomer was also inspired by the 1980s movie Flash Gordon.

Newcomer conceived Joust as a "flying game" with cooperative two-player gameplay; however, he did not wish to emulate the popular space theme of previous successful flying games like Asteroids and Defender. To that end, he made a list of things that could fly: machines, animals, and fictional characters. After evaluating the positive and negative of each idea, Newcomer chose birds for their wide appeal and his familiarity with fantasy and science fiction media featuring birds. To further increase his understanding, Newcomer went to the library to study mythology. He believed that the primary protagonist should ride a majestic bird. The first choice was an eagle, but the lack of graceful land mobility dissuaded him. Instead, he decided that a flying ostrich was more believable than a running eagle. To differentiate between the first and second player characters, the developers picked a stork, believing the proportions were similar to an ostrich while the color difference would avoid confusion among players. Newcomer chose vultures as the main enemies, believing that they would be recognizably evil. Anghelo created concept art of the characters as guidance for further design.

Design

The decision to use birds prompted Newcomer to deviate from the standard eight-direction joystick. He implemented a flapping mechanism to allow players to control the character's ascent and descent. With the vertical direction controlled via the arcade cabinet's button, a two-way joystick was added to dictate horizontal direction. Though other Williams employees were concerned about the design, Newcomer believed that a direct control scheme for flight would strengthen the connection between the player and the character. The combat was devised to allow for higher levels of strategy than traditional shooting games. Because flying became an integral gameplay element, he chose to have characters collide as a means of combat, with victory decided by onscreen elevation.

The developers created the game using 96K of ROM chip storage, which limited the data size of individual graphics and sound effects they could use. The ROM size limits also prohibited Newcomer from creating more characters. The graphics are hand-animated pixel art. To animate the birds, Woldenberg-Miller used Eadweard Muybridge's book Animals In Motion as a reference. Given the limited memory, she had to balance the number of frames (to minimize file size) while maintaining realistic animation. Woldenberg-Miller chose gray for the buzzards, but changed it to green to optimize the color palette as the developers had only 16 colors to create the entire display. Once the colors were decided for the character sprites, Newcomer finalized the look of the platforms. The hardware had limited audio capabilities, and sounds typically require larger amounts of memory than graphics. Working with these restrictions, Newcomer instructed Murphy and Kotlarik to focus on select sounds he deemed important to reinforcing gameplay. He reasoned that the audio would serve as conspicuous hints that players could use to adjust their strategy. Newcomer prioritized the crucial wing-flap sound above others related to the pterodactyl, collisions, and hatching eggs.

In designing the levels, Newcomer added platforms to the environment after the combat was devised. A static game world was chosen, instead of a scrolling world, to focus on detailed visual textures applied to the platforms; the hardware could not easily display the textures while scrolling, and the team believed that displaying the whole environment would aid players. The final game world element designed was a lava pit and a hand reaching out of it to destroy characters too close to the bottom of the screen. Newcomer placed the platforms to optimize Pfutzenreuter's enemy artificial intelligence (AI), which was programmed for attack patterns based partly on platform placements. The knight enemies were designed to exhibit progressively more aggressive behavior. Bounders flew around the environment randomly, occasionally reacting to the protagonist. Hunters sought the player's character in an effort to collide. Shadow Lords flew quickly and closer to the top of the screen; Pfutzenreuter designed them to fly higher when close to the protagonist to increase the Shadow Lord's chances of victory against the player. The pterodactyl was designed to prevent players from idling, and to be difficult to defeat as it was vulnerable only in its open mouth during a specific animation frame and it quickly flies upward at the last moment when approaching a player waiting at the edge of a platform. The game prioritizes its graphics processing to favor the player characters over the enemies, so enemies begin to react more slowly when the number of on-screen sprites increases.

While playtesting the game, the team discovered an animation bug they described as a "belly flop". The flaw allowed players to force the ostrich or stork sprite through an otherwise impassable small gap between two adjacent platforms of very close elevation. Because it provided an interesting method to perform a sneak attack on an opponent below the gap, and because of limited time available, the developers decided to keep the defect as an undocumented feature rather than fix it.

A second bug, which allows the pterodactyl to be easily defeated, was discovered after the game was first distributed. Newcomer had always designed the game and its AI with each sprite's dimension in mind, but the pterodactyl's sprite had been altered to improve the appearance one day before the game was finished. The new sprite allowed the pterodactyl to be easily defeated an unending number of times. The player could sit on the center ledge, with a single enemy knight caught indefinitely in the hand of the Lava Troll, and kill an unlimited number of pterodactyls simply by turning to face them as they entered the screen. Using this flaw, the player could quickly accumulate a very high score, and a large cache of lives, with no significant skill required. Upon learning of the flaw, Williams shipped a new ROM for the arcade cabinets to assuage distributors' complaints.

Ports

Atari, Inc. published Joust for its own systems and under the Atarisoft label for others: Atari 2600, Atari 5200, Atari 7800, Atari 8-bit family, Apple II, Macintosh, and IBM PC.

Joust was ported to the Nintendo Entertainment System—programmed by Satoru Iwata.

A port of Joust to the BBC Micro was done by Stuart Cheshire under the pseudonym "Delos D. Harriman" (which he also used for his networked tank game, Bolo), but since Atarisoft had reportedly ceased releasing titles for other systems, the work remained largely unavailable and was subsequently acquired by Aardvark Software, publisher of Frak and Zalaga, whereupon it received its first review. The game nevertheless remained unavailable for over a year before eventually being released as Skirmish by Godax for the BBC Micro and Acorn Electron.

The Commodore 64 did not receive an official port of Joust in the 1980s, but like many other systems there were several clones. In 2020 Ken Van Mesbergen was preserving 8-inch floppy disks from a former Roklan Corporation employee. On the disk with the Popeye source code, a file called JOUST was also discovered. Ken was able to convert the binary files and source code to a modern format and compile it successfully to emulate the full game in a cartridge image. This was released by the Games That Weren't website.

Reception
Given the peculiar control scheme, Williams was concerned that the game would be unsuccessful, and arcades were hesitant to purchase the game. However, Williams eventually shipped 26,000 units, and Electronic Games in 1983 described it as "tremendously popular". In the United States, it topped the Play Meter arcade charts in January 1983, and the RePlay upright arcade cabinet charts from January to February 1983. It was among the thirteen highest-grossing arcade games of 1983 in the United States.

A cocktail table version was later released, engineered by Leo Ludzia. It is unique among cocktail games with its side-by-side seating rather than opposing sides, allowing Williams to reuse the same ROM chip from the upright cabinets. With substantially fewer units manufactured than the upright arcade machine, the cocktail version is a rare collector's item.

French magazine Tilt rated the arcade game four out of six stars in 1983. Computer and Video Games rated the Atari VCS version 83% in 1989.

Retrospective
In 1995, Flux magazine ranked the arcade version 26th on their Top 100 Video Games writing: "Yeah, it’s bizarre as hell, but it’s as much fun to play now as it was back in 1983." In 1996, Next Generation listed the arcade version as number 83 on its "Top 100 Games of All Time", calling it "a perfect example of the three ingredients that all too often make a classic: Original concepts, quirky designs, and - above all - playability. With only three controls (left, right, and flap), Joust creates an entire world of elegant combat." Video game historian Steve Kent considered Joust one of the more memorable games of its time. Author David Ellis agreed, and stated that the game remains enjoyable to this day. In 2008, Guinness World Records listed it as the number sixty-nine arcade game in technical, creative, and cultural impact. A writer for Video Gaming Illustrated called Joust exotic with lifelike animation. Antic called the Atari 8-bit version a "unique, addictive arcade game" that was "almost identical" to the original. The magazine concluded that Joust was "Atari's finest since Star Raiders".

Kevin Bowen of GameSpy's Classic Gaming wrote that Joust has an "incredibly stupid" concept but is an appealing game with good controls and competitive gameplay. He said it is "one of the first really fun multiplayer games", differentiated from other contemporary multiplayer games, and a precursor to the video game deathmatch.

Retro Gamer writer Mike Bevan called the game's physics "beautifully" realized, and described Joust as one of the "most remarkable and well-loved titles" of the Williams library. A Computer and Video Games writer called the game "weird and wonderful". Author John Sellers praised the competitive two-player gameplay, and attributed the game's appeal to the flapping mechanism. In 2004, Ellis described Joust as an example of innovative risk absent in the then-current video game industry.

In retrospect, Newcomer commended Williams's management for taking a risk on him and the game. The game has garnered praise from industry professionals as well. Jeff Peters of GearWorks Games lauded the gameplay, describing it as unique and intuitive. Jeff Johannigman of Fusion Learning Systems praised the flapping mechanism and Kim Pallister of Microsoft enjoyed the multi-player aspect.

Legacy
A Joust-themed pinball table was released in 1983, designed by Barry Oursler and Constantino Mitchell. The game includes artwork and themes from the arcade version. In addition to single player gameplay, it features competitive two-player gameplay with the players on opposing sides of the machine. Fewer than 500 machines were produced.

An arcade sequel, Joust 2: Survival of the Fittest, was released in 1986. It features similar gameplay with new elements on a vertical screen.

In 2004, Midway Games also launched a website featuring the browser-based Shockwave versions. The game is in several multi-platform compilations: the 1996 Williams Arcade's Greatest Hits, the 2000 Midway's Greatest Arcade Hits, and the 2003 Midway Arcade Treasures. Other compilations are the 1995 Arcade Classic 4 for the Game Boy and the 2005 Midway Arcade Treasures: Extended Play for the PlayStation Portable. Joust was released via digital distribution on GameTap, Xbox Live Arcade, and the PlayStation Network. In 2012, Joust was included in the compilation Midway Arcade Origins.

Other remakes were in development, but never released. Previously unreleased Atarisoft prototypes of Joust for the ColecoVision surfaced in 2001 at the Classic Gaming Expo in Las Vegas. An adaptation with three-dimensional (3D) graphics (and a port of the original Joust as a bonus) was in development for the Atari Jaguar. Titled Dactyl Joust, it was eventually canceled. Another remake in development is Joust 3D for the Nintendo 64. Because the arenas are in 3D, it was to use a split screen for the multiplayer battles. Newcomer pitched an updated version of the arcade game for the Game Boy Advance to Midway Games, which declined. The prototype uses multi-directional scrolling, more detailed graphics based on 3D renders, and new gameplay mechanics.

Tiger Electronics released a keychain version of Joust in 1998.

A mobile phone version was released in 2005, but omitted the flapping control scheme.  It is also an included title on the Midway Legacy Edition Arcade1Up cabinet.

Influenced games
Several games by other developers either copy or build upon Jousts design. The 1983 Jetpac and Mario Bros., and the 1984 Balloon Fight, have elements inspired by it. The flying mechanics in the 2000 game Messiah were inspired by Joust. The arcade game Killer Queen was heavily inspired by Joust, and mixes elements of it with RTS and MOBA games.

Popular culture
Midway Games optioned Jousts movie rights to CP Productions in 2007. Michael Cerenzie of CP Productions described the script by Marc Gottlieb as "Gladiator meets Mad Max", set 25 years in the future. The June 2008 release date was pushed back to 2009, then Midway filed for Chapter 11 bankruptcy in 2009. Warner Bros. Interactive Entertainment purchased most of Midway's assets, including Joust, with the intent to develop movie adaptations.

Joust is referenced in the Robot Chicken episode "Celebutard Mountain", the Code Monkeys episode "Just One of the Gamers", and the video games Mortal Kombat 3 (Shang Tsung turns into the character from Joust as his friendship) and World of Warcraft: Cataclysm. In the book Ready Player One, Wade Watts defeats an NPC in 2-player Joust. In the movie Spiderhead the character Jeff can be seen playing the game.

See also

 Williams Arcade's Greatest Hits

Notes

References

External links
 

1982 video games
Amiga games
Arcade video games
Assembly language software
Atari 2600 games
Atari 5200 games
Atari 7800 games
Atari 8-bit family games
Atari Lynx games
Atari ST games
Cooperative video games
Head-to-head arcade video games
Classic Mac OS games
Midway video games
Warner Bros. Games franchises
Nintendo Entertainment System games
Williams video games
Video games about birds
Video games adapted into films
Video games developed in the United States
Multiplayer and single-player video games